The Ancienne Belgique (French for "Old Belgium") is a concert hall for contemporary music in Brussels, Belgium. Located in the historic heart of Brussels, it is one of the leading concert venues in Belgium, hosting a wide variety of international and local acts.

The venue
The venue consists of three concert halls: the "Main Hall", the "ABBox", and the "ABClub". The Main Hall is, logically, the Ancienne Belgique's main hall, and has a capacity of 2,000 people. It is said to be one of the best concert halls in Belgium, with perfect acoustics. The ABBox is the newest addition to the Ancienne Belgique. It is the same space as the Main Hall, but rearranged for greater intimacy: the seats in the back and the balconies at the sides of the hall are covered, limiting its capacity to 800 people. The ABBox is the Ancienne Belgique's response to the need for a smaller concert hall to host less well-known acts, helping them gain a new and larger audience. The ABClub has a capacity of approximately 250 people, and hosts smaller, up-and-coming acts.

Notable concerts
In January 1955, Jacques Brel supported the performances of the Belgian pop and variety pioneer Bobbejaan Schoepen for one week.

Suicide performed at the Ancienne Belgique on June 16, 1978. The crowd was hostile, wanting to hear the main act (Elvis Costello), and the members of Suicide antagonized the audience further during the performance. The recorded performance, on which many confrontational exchanges can be heard, was eventually released as 23 Minutes Over Brussels.

In 1982, The Cure played a concert which ended in a fight between band-members on stage. The band split up right after this gig, yet reformed months later.

Circa 1986, Ancienne Belgique hosted a popular club night with DJ "Fat" Ronny Harmsen whose distinctive DJ-ing style, dubbed "AB" music after the club's initials, laid the groundwork for the emergence of the New Beat genre.

The Domino festival, which was held annually from 1999 to 2011, hosted some underground artists that later broke into the mainstream.

Albums and videos recorded at the Ancienne Belgique
In 1999, Iggy Pop performed a concert that was recorded on a DVD and made available with his 2005 release A Million in Prizes.

In 2000, the rock band Oasis played a notable concert which was taped by MTV.

Magnolia Electric Co.'s live album, Trials & Errors, was recorded at Ancienne Belgique in April, 2003 and released in January, 2005.

The Hives' 2004 performance was released as the live DVD Tussles in Brussels.

Róisín Murphy released the limited double CD Live at Ancienne Belgique in November, 2007.

Yeasayer released a live album Live At Ancienne Belgique, which was recorded on October 28, 2010, in the venue.

Kings of Leon released a limited edition EP in 2004, Day Old Belgian Blues, that was recorded at the ABBox.

Monster Magnet placed two songs from a 2014 performance (which also was the debut for recent bassist Chris Kosnik) at the AB on Milking the Stars: A Re-Imagining of Last Patrol. The songs chosen were "Last Patrol" and "Three Kingfishers".

Calexico released three live albums recorded at the Ancienne Belgique in 2008 and 2012.

Netsky went to Ancienne Belgique in 2012 for his song "Give & Take".

King Gizzard & the Lizard Wizard's performances at Ancienne Belgique on October 8 and 9, 2019 would be released in 2020 as Live in Brussels '19. It would also be partially included in their 2020 concert film Chunky Shrapnel.

See also
 List of concert halls

References

External links

Official Ancienne Belgique Web Site

Buildings and structures in Brussels
City of Brussels
Culture in Brussels
Concert halls in Belgium
Tourist attractions in Brussels